Atokos is a small, uninhabited Greek island in the Ionian Sea off the coast of Acarnania and is one of the most westerly and perhaps remotest of the Echinades Islands. , it had no resident population. From such large vessels you can get a reasonable view of the southwestern end (narrow aspect) of the island and its steep cliffs.
To approach it and land requires a private boat, and safe anchorage is advisable only in calm weather at one of its two key anchorages: One House Bay on the east coast and Cliff Bay on the south coast. The former is the preferred option as it shelters boats from the prevailing northwest winds and has better access to the island via a pebbled beach and small flat hinterland.

The island is administered by the municipality of Ithaca, but is a private island owned by the shipping magnate Panayiotis Tsakos. The island is uninhabited except for a few goats that roam freely around the island. These animals appear to be tended by a shepherd who visits and tends to the flock every fourth day as part of an agreement with the current owner.

Visitors are allowed to land on the island. A small chapel has an open door to visitors and appears to be cleaned and well maintained. The chapel can be found by following a short path from the beach at One House Bay, and past the island's well and supply of brackish water. Confusingly, this small holy building is not the "one house" that gives the main bay its name. To locate the simple two-story house that gives the bay its name, follow another short path at the north end of the beach and through the noisy cicada-filled woods towards the foot of the main hill on the island. The house is locked but is habitable, presumably for use by the family owners who sometimes visit in September.

The island was on the market in 2015 for €44 million with potential for hotel development, but as the island is inside a NATURA 2000 area and is close to the island of Oxia, which was sold in 2013 to Sheikh Hamad bin Khalifa al-Thani, the Emir of Qatar, for €4.9M, this price may not be reached easily.

References

External links
Atokos on GTP Travel Pages (in English and Greek)

Islands of the Ionian Islands (region)
Islands of Greece
Landforms of Ithaca
Private islands of Greece